Stacy Brown-Philpot is the former CEO of TaskRabbit and a member of the Board of Directors of Noom, HP Inc and Nordstrom.

Education
Brown-Philpot is from Detroit, Michigan. She received a B.S. from the Wharton School of Business and an M.B.A. from Stanford University.

Career
Brown-Philpot began working at Google in 2003. Prior to joining TaskRabbit, she was at Google for almost 10 years. Brown-Philpot had moved from San Francisco Bay Area to Hyderabad, India to head Google's online sales and operations. In 2015, Brown-Philpot was selected for Fortune's 40 Under 40 ranking of the most significant young people in business.

Brown-Philpot is the CEO of TaskRabbit, and a member of the Board of Directors of Noom and HP Inc. The Financial Times has noted she is a "rare example of a black, female chief executive in the tech industry."

References

Living people
American computer businesspeople
Wharton School of the University of Pennsylvania alumni
Stanford University alumni
Businesspeople from Detroit
Henry Crown Fellows
Year of birth missing (living people)